The 2017 Best Footballer in Asia, given to the best football player in Asia as judged by a panel of 42 sports journalists, was awarded to Son Heung-min on 5 January 2018. Son thus became the first footballer who had won the award for three times.

Voting
In this edition of Best Footballer in Asia, 42 jurors were invited to vote. Among the 42 jurors, 36 of them represent different AFC nations/regions including Afghanistan, Australia, Bahrain, Bangladesh, Cambodia, China, Chinese Taipei, Hong Kong, India, Indonesia, Iran, Iraq, Japan, Jordan, Korea Republic, Kuwait, Kyrgyzstan, Lebanon, Macao, Malaysia, Myanmar, Oman, Pakistan, Palestine, Philippines, Qatar, Saudi Arabia, Singapore, Syria, Tajikistan, Thailand, Turkmenistan, United Arabic Emirates, Uzbekistan, Vietnam and Yemen. Six other jurors were invited representing well-known football media outlets or as independent Asian football experts.

Rules 
Each juror selects 5 best footballers and awards them 6, 4, 3, 2 points and 1 point respectively from their first choice to the fifth choice. The trophy of the Best Footballer in Asia is awarded to the player with the highest total of points.

Tiebreakers
When two or more candidates obtain the same points, the rankings of the concerned candidates would be based upon the following criteria in order. 

a) The number of the 1st-place vote obtained

b) The number of the 2nd-place vote obtained

c) The number of the 3rd-place vote obtained

d) The number of the 4th-place vote obtained

If all conditions are equal, the concerned candidates will be tied in rankings. 

If the concerned candidates are tied in the first-place, the concerned candidates will share the award and the trophy.

Ranking

References 

2017
2017 awards
2017 in Asian football